The  was a political party in Empire of Japan. It was also known as simply the Kaishintō.

The Kaishintō was founded by Ōkuma Shigenobu on 16 April 1882, with the assistance of Yano Ryūsuke, Inukai Tsuyoshi and Ozaki Yukio. It received financial backing by the Mitsubishi zaibatsu, and had strong support from the Japanese press, and urban intellectuals.

The Kaishintō pursued a moderate approach, calling for a British-style constitutional monarchy within the framework of a parliamentary democracy. In a speech Ōkuma gave at the inauguration of the party, he emphasized the symbolic role of the monarch in the type of government he envisioned. He also argued that those extremists who supported having the emperor directly involved in political decision-making were in fact endangering the very existence of the Imperial institution.

In the first General Election of 1890, the Kaishintō won 46 seats to the Lower House of the Diet of Japan  thus becoming the second largest party after the Liberal Party (Jiyūtō).

Afterwards, the Kaishintō adopted an increasingly nationalistic foreign policy, and in March 1896 merged with several smaller nationalist parties to form the Shimpotō.

Election results

Notes

References
 Jansen, Marius B. (2000). The Making of Modern Japan. Cambridge: Harvard University Press. ;  OCLC 44090600
 Keene, Donald. (2002). Emperor of Japan: Meiji and His World, 1852–1912. New York: Columbia University Press. ; OCLC 46731178
 Sims, Richard L. (2001). Japanese Political History Since the Meiji Renovation 1868–2000. New York: Palgrave Macmillan. ; ;  OCLC 45172740

Defunct political parties in Japan
Political parties established in 1882
Political parties disestablished in 1896
1882 establishments in Japan
1896 disestablishments in Japan
Politics of the Empire of Japan